The 1997–98 ISU Champions Series Final was an elite figure skating competition held in Munich, Germany from December 18 through 20, 1997. Medals were awarded in men's singles, ladies' singles, pair skating, and ice dancing.

The Champions Series Final was the culminating event of the ISU Champions Series, which consisted of Skate America, Skate Canada International, Nations Cup, Trophée Lalique, Cup of Russia, and NHK Trophy competitions. The top six skaters from each discipline competed in the final.

Results

Men

Ladies

Pair

Ice dancing

References

External links
 Ice Skating International Online

1997 in figure skating
Grand Prix of Figure Skating Final
Grand Prix of Figure Skating Final
Grand Prix of Figure Skating Final
Grand Prix of Figure Skating Final
1990s in Bavaria
1998 in German sport
1998 in figure skating
December 1997 sports events in Europe